Maidstone West railway station is one of three railway stations which serve the town of Maidstone, in Kent, England. The station and all trains that serve the station are operated by Southeastern.

History 

Due largely to opposition from the town's merchants, and the fear expressed by the then Mayor that "Maidstone will be ruined as a commercial town", the town was bypassed when the South Eastern Main Line opened by the South Eastern Railway (SER) in 1842. The line ran approximately eight miles to the south, with the nearest station being at Maidstone Road (later renamed Paddock Wood). On 25 September 1844, a branch line was opened from Paddock Wood to Maidstone West. This was extended further up the Medway Valley to the North Kent Line at Strood on 18 June 1856. The main station building is believed to date from this time.

Maidstone West has a signal box — located at the southern end of the station — which is used as the point at which the mileage measurements and the "Up" and "Down" directions to London change. South of the signal box, the distance from London is measured via Paddock Wood, and the Up (towards London) direction is southbound. From the signal box northwards, however, mileages are measured via Strood and the northbound line is the Up direction. On 3 August 1944, the signal box was severely damaged when a doodlebug landed nearby. Seven people were killed, as well as two dray horses belonging to Maidstone brewers Fremlins. The signalbox was repaired and returned to service.

Just south of Maidstone West was a station at Tovil. Passenger services ceased on 15 March 1943. A short line ran on a bridge across the River Medway to a goods station at Tovil Goods until 3 October 1977, from which point the branch line closed completely.

Services 
All services at Maidstone West are operated by Southeastern using  and  EMUs.

The typical off-peak service in trains per hour is:
 2 tph to 
 2 tph to  

The station is also served by two peak hour high speed services per day to and from London St Pancras International.

On Sundays, the service is reduced to hourly in each direction.

References

External links 

Railway stations in Kent
DfT Category E stations
Former South Eastern Railway (UK) stations
Railway stations in Great Britain opened in 1844
Railway stations served by Southeastern
Buildings and structures in Maidstone